The 2018–19 South Alabama Jaguars men's basketball team represents the University of South Alabama during the 2018–19 NCAA Division I men's basketball season. The Jaguars are led by first-year head coach Richie Riley and play their home games at the Mitchell Center in Mobile, Alabama as members in the Sun Belt Conference.

Previous season
The Jaguars finished the 2017–18 season 14–18, 7–11 in Sun Belt play to finish in ninth place. They lost to Troy in the first round of the Sun Belt tournament.

Off-season

Departures

Incoming transfers

Roster

Schedule and results

|-
!colspan=9 style=| Exhibition

|-
!colspan=9 style=| Non-conference regular season

|-
!colspan=9 style=| Regular season

|-
!colspan=9 style=| Sun Belt tournament

See also
 2018–19 South Alabama Jaguars women's basketball team

References

2017-18
2018–19 Sun Belt Conference men's basketball season
2018 in sports in Alabama
2019 in sports in Alabama